Timothy Wilking Finin (born 1949 in Walworth, Wisconsin) is the Willard and Lillian Hackerman Chair in Engineering and is a Professor of Computer Science and Electrical Engineering at the University of Maryland, Baltimore County (UMBC).  His research has focused on the applications of artificial intelligence to problems in information systems and has included contributions to natural language processing, expert systems, the theory and applications of multiagent systems, the semantic web, and mobile computing.

Education
Finin earned an undergraduate degree in Electrical Engineering from MIT in 1971 and a PhD in Computer Science from the University of Illinois at Urbana–Champaign in 1980.

Career
Prior to joining the UMBC, he held positions at the Unisys Paoli Research Center, the University of Pennsylvania, and the MIT Artificial Intelligence Laboratory. Since 2007 he has been an affiliate faculty member at the Human Language Technology Center of Excellence at Johns Hopkins University. He is the author of more than 450 refereed publications and has received research grants and contracts from a variety of sources.

He has been an organizer of several major conferences, including the IEEE Conference on Artificial Intelligence for Applications, ACM Conference on Information and Knowledge Management, ACM Autonomous Agents conference, ACM Conference on Mobile and Ubiquitous Computing, International Semantic Web Conference and IEEE International Conference on Intelligence and Security Informatics.  He served as an editor in chief of the Journal of Web Semantics from 2005 to 2016, is currently a co-editor of the Viewpoints section of Communications of the ACM and is on the editorial board of several other journals.  Finin is a former AAAI councilor and board member of the Computing Research Association.

Awards
In 1997 he was selected as a fellow of the Foundation for Intelligent Physical Agents for his work on agent communication languages. The IEEE Computer Society gave him a Technical Achievement Award "for pioneering contributions to distributed intelligent systems" in 2009. In 2012 he was selected as UMBC's Presidential Research Professor for the three-year term 2012–2015.  In 2013 he was named a fellow of the Association for the Advancement of Artificial Intelligence for "significant contributions to the theory and practice of knowledge sharing in multiagent systems and on the Web, and for sustained service to the AI community".

In 2018, the Association for Computing Machinery named him an ACM Fellow for his contributions to the theory and practice of knowledge sharing in distributed systems and the World Wide Web.

References

1949 births
Living people
Fellows of the Association for the Advancement of Artificial Intelligence
Fellows of the Association for Computing Machinery
Artificial intelligence researchers
American computer scientists
MIT School of Engineering alumni
Grainger College of Engineering alumni
People from Walworth, Wisconsin
University of Maryland, Baltimore County faculty
Semantic Web people
Natural language processing researchers